The Clinical Neuropharmacology  is a peer-reviewed bimonthly journal publishes original articles,  brief reports, reviews devoted to the pharmacology of the nervous system in its broadest sense. According to the Journal Citation Reports, the journal has a 2014 impact factor of 2.009 . The journal ranks 148/254 among Pharmacology & Pharmacy and 116/192 Clinical Neurology.

References

Bimonthly journals
Publications established in 1976
Lippincott Williams & Wilkins academic journals
Pharmacology journals
English-language journals